Next of kin is a person's closest living blood relative or relatives.

Next of Kin may also refer to:

Film and television
The Next of Kin, a 1942 British film often called Next of Kin
Next of Kin (1982 film), an Australian/New Zealand film
Next of Kin (1984 film), a Canadian film 
Next of Kin (1989 film), an action film
Next of Kin (TV series), a 1995 to 1997 British sitcom
Next of Kin (2008 film), an American film starring Bess Armstrong
"Next of Kin" (Arrow), an episode of Arrow
Next of Kin (2018 TV series), a 2018 British thriller-drama series starring Archie Panjabi
Next of Kin (2021 film), a 2021 supernatural horror film from the Paranormal Activity film series

Other uses
Next of Kin (nonfiction), a book by primate researcher Roger Fouts about his experiences with chimpanzee Washoe
Next of Kin (novel), a 1959 science fiction novel by Eric Frank Russell
Next of Kin (band), a British pop rock band made up of three brothers